Trust Us is the seventh full-length studio album by the Norwegian rock-band Motorpsycho.

The tracks "Ozone" and "Hey, Jane" were also released as EPs. In 1999, The song "Vortex surfer" was selected by the NRK P3 radio-station as the "song of the millennium", and was played continuously for 24 hours on December 31.

The cover-art was, as usual, made by Kim Hiorthøy, who also directed the promo-videos for the two EPs.

Track listing

Disc 1

Disc 2

Personnel 
Bent Sæther: vocals, bass, guitars, piano, percussion, harmonium, marimba, vibraphone, trident, mellotron, sitar, taurus, drums
Hans Magnus Ryan: guitars, vocals, mandolin, harmonium, rhodes piano, taurus, mellotron, piano, bells
Håkon Gebhardt: drums, acoustic guitar, glockenspiel, mellotron, harmonium, percussion

with
Helge Sten (Deathprod): loops, theremin, echomachines
Ole Henrik Moe (Ohm): saw, violin, glass
Trygve Seim: reindeer antler, flutes, saxophone, clarophone
Tone Reichelt: French horn on "Taifun"
Kai O. Andersen: Upright bass on "Ozone"
Jarle Vespestad: beats on "Evernine"

References

External links 
Motorpsycho - Trust us - 577 on YouTube

Motorpsycho albums
1998 albums